Myrofyllo is a village and a former community in the Trikala regional unit, Thessaly, Greece. Since the 2011 local government reform it is part of the municipality Pyli, of which it is a municipal unit. The municipal unit has an area of 32.932 km2. Its population is 350 in the winter and 1000 in the summer.

References

Populated places in Trikala (regional unit)